Only Croatia – Movement for Croatia is a defunct political party in Croatia, formed in 2007.

The party was established by disaffected founding members of the HDZ, the Croatian Bloc (which extinguished itself the following year), and by a group of Croatian generals, including Marinko Krešić and Ljubo Ćesić Rojs, who were deeply worried about perceived foreign economic and political threats to the Croatian State.

The party opposes foreign ownership of strategic Croatian resources and real-estate, including the media and key industries. Likewise, the party is against Croatian membership of NATO and especially the European Union. Only Croatia does not recognise the current borders of the Republic of Croatia, delineated by the Communists in 1943 and imposed in 1945, as being either its historic or natural borders.

In the 2007 Croatian parliamentary election, the party competed but won no seats in Sabor. Their best showing was in the 6th electoral district where they won 1.77% of the vote.

Only Croatia – Movement for Croatia was struck from the register of political parties on 11 January 2019.

Electoral history

Legislative

European Parliament

References

External links

2007 establishments in Croatia
2019 disestablishments in Croatia
Croatian nationalist parties
Defunct nationalist parties in Croatia
Far-right politics in Croatia
Political parties disestablished in 2019
Political parties established in 2007